Mary Gail Sullivan (born 6 January 1962) is a former American rugby union player.

Biography 
Sullivan made her Eagles debut on November 14 1987 against Canada at Victoria, British Columbia. It was the first women's test match to be played outside of Europe.

Sullivan's rugby career spanned over twenty years. She graduated from the Muscular Therapy Institute in Cambridge, Massachusetts in 1993 and taught there for fifteen years. She also served as department chair of the Massage Technique department and went into private practice in 1992.

In 2017 Sullivan and the 1991 World Cup squad were inducted into the United States Rugby Hall of Fame.

References

Living people
United States women's international rugby union players
American female rugby union players
Female rugby union players
1952 births